Lorenzo Garbieri (1580 – 5 April 1654) was an Italian painter of the early-Baroque period, active mainly in Bologna. He was one of the painters in the studio of Ludovico Carracci and is sometimes called il nipote dei Carracci. He was said to be one of the most successful imitators of Ludovico, to whose style he added the character of Caravaggio.

He painted the Plague of Milan in the chapel of San Carlo at the church of the Barnabites. He painted St Paul resuscitating a youth for the church of the Congregation of the Oratory of Saint Philip Neri in Fano. He painted the Martyrdom of St Felicita and her seven sons for San Maurizio in Mantua.

He painted five canvases (1613) for the chapel of the Annunciation in the church of San Bartolomeo, Modena, including Birth of the Virgin, Annunciation.  He had also paintings made for Milan and Reggio-Emilia. One of his painting his located at the Dinan's Museum.

Rejecting an offer to become court painter at Mantua, he returned to Bologna to take a bride with a rich dowry, after which his career declined. His son and pupil, Carlo Garbieri, was a history painter.

External links

Bibliography

1580 births
1654 deaths
16th-century Italian painters
Italian male painters
17th-century Italian painters
Painters from Bologna
Italian Baroque painters